The Galician chant (Ukrainian: галицький розспів), is a form of liturgical chant originating in Western Ukraine, used predominantly by the Ukrainian Greek Catholic Church and the Western Eparchy of the Ukrainian Orthodox Church of Canada, and to a lesser degree the Ukrainian Orthodox Church. Along with the Kievan and Znamenny chants, the Galician chant has eight tones or modes.

The first compilation of Galician chant by a Ukrainian was in 1894.

References

Christian liturgical music
Christian chants
Eastern Orthodox liturgical music
Ukrainian music
Musicology
Ukrainian Greek Catholic Church
Ukrainian Orthodox Church of Canada
Orthodox Church of Ukraine
Galicia (Eastern Europe)